Sully is an unincorporated community in Randolph County, in the U.S. state of West Virginia.

History
A post office called Sully was established in 1906, and remained in operation until 1953. The origin of the name Sully is obscure.

References

Unincorporated communities in Randolph County, West Virginia
Unincorporated communities in West Virginia